The second season of House premiered on September 13, 2005 and ended on May 23, 2006. During the season, House tries to cope with his feelings for his ex-girlfriend Stacy Warner, who, after he diagnosed her husband with acute intermittent porphyria, has taken a job in the legal department of Princeton-Plainsboro Teaching Hospital.

Sela Ward's chemistry with Hugh Laurie in the final two episodes of the first season was strong enough to have her character return in seven episodes of the second season.

Cast and characters

Main cast
Hugh Laurie as Dr. Gregory House
Lisa Edelstein as Dr. Lisa Cuddy
Omar Epps as Dr. Eric Foreman
Robert Sean Leonard as Dr. James Wilson
Jennifer Morrison as Dr. Allison Cameron
Jesse Spencer as Dr. Robert Chase

Recurring cast
Sela Ward as Stacy Warner
Stephanie Venditto as Nurse Brenda Previn
Currie Graham as Mark Warner
Diane Baker as Blythe House
R. Lee Ermey as John House
Charles S. Dutton as Rodney Foreman
Ron Perkins as Dr. Ron Simpson

Guest cast
Laura Allen, Yareli Arizmendi, Matthew John Armstrong, Mackenzie Astin, Christine Avila, Marshall Bell, Peter Birkenhead, Tamara Braun, Yvette Nicole Brown, Dan Butler, Scott Michael Campbell, Christopher Carley, Jewel Christian, Michelle Clunie, Aasha Davis, Thomas Dekker, Stephanie Erb, Elle Fanning, Bruce French, Erica Gimpel, Greg Grunberg, Wings Hauser, Taraji P. Henson, Howard Hesseman, Wil Horneff, Ryan Hurst, James Immekus, LL Cool J, William Katt, Mimi Kennedy, Edward Kerr, Elias Koteas, Nathan Kress, Tom Lenk, Ron Livingston, Samantha Mathis, Jayma Mays, Eddie Mills, Cynthia Nixon, Michael O'Keefe, America Olivo, Kip Pardue, Randall Park, Sasha Pieterse, Kristoffer Polaha, Clifton Powell, Keri Lynn Pratt, Cameron Richardson, Charlie Robinson, Ignacio Serricchio, Vicellous Reon Shannon, Allison Smith, Christie Lynn Smith, D. B. Sweeney, Chris Tallman, Michelle Trachtenberg, Hillary Tuck, Alanna Ubach, Stephanie Venditto, Tom Verica, JR Villarreal and Julie Warner.

Reception
The season gained high Nielsen ratings; "No Reason" was watched by 25.47 million viewers, the show's biggest audience ever at that point. Season two averaged 17.3 million viewers an episode, outperforming season one by 30%. The number of viewers made it the tenth most-watched show of the 2005–2006 television season.

Writer Lawrence Kaplow won a Writers Guild of America Award in 2006 for the episode "Autopsy".

Episodes

DVD releases

References
General
 
 

Specific

Further reading

External links

 
 House recaps at televisionwithoutpity.com
 House episodes information at film.com
 List of House episodes at TVGuide.com
 

 
2005 American television seasons
2006 American television seasons